Victor LaRue Klee, Jr. (September 18, 1925 – August 17, 2007) was a mathematician specialising in convex sets, functional analysis, analysis of algorithms, optimization, and combinatorics.  He spent almost his entire career at the University of Washington in Seattle.

Life
Born in San Francisco, Vic Klee earned his B.A. degree in 1945 with high honors from Pomona College, majoring in mathematics and chemistry.  He did his graduate studies, including a thesis on Convex Sets in Linear Spaces, and received his PhD in mathematics from the University of Virginia in 1949. After teaching for several years at the University of Virginia, he moved in 1953 to the University of Washington in Seattle, Washington, where he was a faculty member for 54 years.
He died in Lakewood, Ohio.

Research
Klee wrote more than 240 research papers.  He proposed Klee's measure problem and the art gallery problem. Kleetopes are also named after him, as is the Klee–Minty cube, which shows that the simplex algorithm for linear programming does not work in polynomial time in the worst–case scenario.

Service and recognition
Klee served as president of the Mathematical Association of America from 1971 to 1973. In 1972 he won a Lester R. Ford Award.

Notes

Further reading
  Short biography, and reminiscences of colleagues.

External links
Applied Geometry and Discrete Mathematics a volume dedicated to Klee on his 65th birthday.
Brief obituary at the Mathematical Association of America (MAA)
AMS column: People Making a Difference

MAA presidents: Victor LaRue Klee
 Shapes of the Future: Some unsolved problems in geometry.  Two dimensions, Three dimensions

1925 births
2007 deaths
Writers from San Francisco
University of Virginia alumni
University of Washington faculty
20th-century American mathematicians
Fellows of the American Academy of Arts and Sciences
Fellows of the American Association for the Advancement of Science
Institute for Advanced Study visiting scholars
Presidents of the Mathematical Association of America
Educators from California
American science writers
Pomona College alumni